The Class KF (聯盟型, 'Confederation class', re-designated "ㄎㄈ" or "KF") was a 4-8-4 mainline passenger steam locomotive type built in the United Kingdom by the Vulcan Foundry for the railways of China. Between 1935 and 1936, 24 locomotives were built for the Guangzhou–Hankou Railway designated as the 600 series. Following World War II, and the establishment of the People's Republic of China, the Chinese Government assumed control of the railway and re-designated the engines in 1954 as the "ㄎㄈ" class ("ㄎㄈ" being the Zhuyin characters for "K(o)-F(o)") from the first two syllables of "Confederation", and in 1959 as the "KF" class.

History 
In July 1933, the Guangdong–Hankou Railway was in need of new motive power for their being finished Guangzhou to Shaoguan line (capital of Guangdong Province to the northern border of the province).  However, this particular line had been burdened with gradients of around two percent as well as curves with less than  radi, and low capacity bridges.  This necessitated a locomotive design that had more tractive effort while retaining a low axle load.  The railway approached the Vulcan Foundry in Britain, who devised a series of 24 locomotives of a 4-8-4 wheel arrangement.

The engines were a significant improvement over previous designs, incorporating a more efficient E-type superheater and duplex steam valve to allow better steaming without enlarging the boiler.  The 4-8-4 wheel arrangement allowed for better weight distribution as well as improved handling on sharp curves.
When the Changsha - Canton Railway was completed in October 1936, the class KF 1 - 24 locomotives  During World War II the locomotive  was transferred to Guangxi Province through Hunan–Guangxi Railway, free from Japanese occupied zone. After the establishment of the People's Republic of China, the locomotives were repaired and upgraded to use in Shanghai–Nanjing Railway.

Most of the class KF survived the 1937 - 1945 Sino-Japanese war. They retained their old classification and continued in service up to early 1970s. 
Builder details:
 KF 1-16 2D2-h2 520x725 1752 Vulcan Foundry 4668 - 4683 / 1935 Renumbered to 'KF' 601 - 616
 KF 17-24 2D2-h2 520x725 1752 Vulcan Foundry 4696 - 4703 / 1936 Renumbered to 'KF' 617 - 624

Preservation

Two examples are known to have been preserved. KF7 was presented by the Chinese Government to the National Railway Museum, England in 1981. Another KF class locomotive is preserved at the Beijing Railway Museum, China.

References

External links

Vulcan Foundry locomotives
Steam locomotives of China
4-8-4 locomotives
Standard gauge locomotives of China
Railway locomotives introduced in 1935
Passenger locomotives